Emu is a puppet emu which was given to British entertainer Rod Hull in the 1960s while he was presenting a children's breakfast television programme in Australia.  Hull adopted the mute puppet for his cabaret act, and took it with him to the United Kingdom when he returned in 1970. The character was given a mischievous and sometimes aggressive onstage persona, attacking celebrity guests (and Hull himself) for comic effect.  Hull and Emu also appeared on several episodes of The Hudson Brothers' comedy show in the United States.

Emu's new series 

The first episode of Emu's new series, simply called Emu, was broadcast on 8 October 2007. The first series was filmed in Belfast with shots at Queens Street Flats. The main characters are Emu and his owner, Toby (Toby Hull), a computer games designer. Toby has to keep Emu a secret from Ken Cole, a grumpy security guard. Toby's neighbours, children Charlie and Dani, help him to keep Emu a secret. Toby's other neighbour, Sophie, is the villainess of the show: an air hostess who becomes obsessed with making money off of Emu, but her plans always backfire on her. At the end of the first series, Emu and Toby moved back to Australia.
 
In June 2009, it was announced that a second series of the show with 26 episodes would be produced by the Gibson Group, a New Zealand film and broadcast company. Most of the cast were New Zealand actors. The plot in the second series revolves around Toby's job in a kids' cafe. He meets Kelly (Bryony Skillington), the cafe manager, who is allergic to birds (especially Emu), although she still adores Emu. Cafe kids Sam and Georgia live upstairs above the cafe. They are good friends with Emu. They all must watch out for Leo Leach (Toby Leach), the town inspector who is strict with pest control; he will close the cafe down if an animal is found.
 
The first episode of the second series was broadcast on 13 September 2009 on ITV1 at 9.45am. The second series puppeteer was Nick Blake and the director was Danny Mulheron the same director of Paradise Café made by the same company. The second episode was also broadcast on the same day.
 
It was shown on CITV with repeats until April 2014.
 
List of episodes
 
Series 1 2007-2008
 
</onlyinclude>
 
Series 2 2009
 
</onlyinclude>

UK television career 1975-1989

During the 1970s, Hull and Emu achieved national fame in the UK with their BBC series Emu's Broadcasting Company.  The duo moved to ITV in the 1980s, where a succession of shows were produced concerning their ongoing war with Grotbags, a witch played by Carol Lee Scott.

References

Fictional characters introduced in 1960
Fictional flightless birds
British comedy puppets
Fictional mute characters
Television sidekicks